Derek Pitman is a British archaeologist, lecturer, presenter, and deputy head of the Department of Archaeology and Anthropology at Bournemouth University, specialised in ancient metallurgy and geophysical prospection.

Education and career
Pitman received his bachelor's degree in Archaeology at Bournemouth University before studying a masters in Archaeomaterials at the University of Sheffield. He researched his PhD, entitled “Craft Practice and Resource Perception in the Southern Urals During the Middle Bronze Age” at the University of Sheffield.

Since 2018 Pitman has led Bournemouth University's excavations at Wytch Farm in Dorset, and he is the survey director of the ongoing Greek-Swedish Palamas Archaeological Project at Thessalian Vlochos, Greece. He has also worked and published on Swedish, Spanish, Russian, and New Zealand archaeology.

Media appearances
Pitman is a host and co-creator (together with Lawrence Shaw) of the archaeology podcast Career in ruins. He has also appeared on multiple episodes of the online revival spin off of the British Archeological TV programme Time Team, Time Team's Tea Time.

In 2021 Pitman was announced as a member of Time Team for their crowd funded revival. In addition to being part of the team he presents the companion programme “Dig Watch” that gives behind the scenes access to the production of the new episodes alongside Career in Ruins co-host Lawrence Shaw.

Selected publications

H. Manley, D. Pitman, E. Wilkes, A. Brown, C. Randall, and D. Carter (2020). "Poole Harbour: Current understanding of the Later Prehistoric to Medieval archaeology and future directions for research". Proceedings of the Dorset Natural History & Archaeological Society 141, 71–97.
A. Brown and D. Pitman (2019). "Resource procurement and inter-regional connections in pre-contact Taranaki, New Zealand: New evidence from geochemical analysis of obsidian". Archaeology in Oceania 54(3), 149–162.
M. Russell, P. Cheetham, K. Barrass, D. Evans, E. Hambleton, H. Manley, D. Pitman, and D. Stewart, (2019). "The Durotriges Project 2017: an interim statement". Proceedings of the Dorset Natural History & Archaeological Society 139, 127–133.

References

Living people
1983 births
British archaeologists
English archaeologists
Academics of Bournemouth University
Fellows of the Higher Education Academy